The Orekhovo-Zuyevo constituency (No.123) is a Russian legislative constituency in Moscow Oblast. The constituency covers northeastern Moscow Oblast.

Members elected

Election results

1993

|-
! colspan=2 style="background-color:#E9E9E9;text-align:left;vertical-align:top;" |Candidate
! style="background-color:#E9E9E9;text-align:left;vertical-align:top;" |Party
! style="background-color:#E9E9E9;text-align:right;" |Votes
! style="background-color:#E9E9E9;text-align:right;" |%
|-
|style="background-color:"|
|align=left|Vladimir Kvasov
|align=left|Independent
|
|26.70%
|-
|style="background-color:"|
|align=left|Vladimir Bryntsalov
|align=left|Independent
| -
|20.40%
|-
| colspan="5" style="background-color:#E9E9E9;"|
|- style="font-weight:bold"
| colspan="3" style="text-align:left;" | Total
| 
| 100%
|-
| colspan="5" style="background-color:#E9E9E9;"|
|- style="font-weight:bold"
| colspan="4" |Source:
|
|}

1995

|-
! colspan=2 style="background-color:#E9E9E9;text-align:left;vertical-align:top;" |Candidate
! style="background-color:#E9E9E9;text-align:left;vertical-align:top;" |Party
! style="background-color:#E9E9E9;text-align:right;" |Votes
! style="background-color:#E9E9E9;text-align:right;" |%
|-
|style="background-color:#DA2021"|
|align=left|Vladimir Bryntsalov
|align=left|Ivan Rybkin Bloc
|
|25.65%
|-
|style="background-color:"|
|align=left|Yury Ivanov
|align=left|Communist Party
|
|17.63%
|-
|style="background-color:#F21A29"|
|align=left|Vladimir Kvasov (incumbent)
|align=left|Trade Unions and Industrialists – Union of Labour
|
|12.03%
|-
|style="background-color:"|
|align=left|Anatoly Vetlov
|align=left|Independent
|
|9.78%
|-
|style="background-color:#2C299A"|
|align=left|Aleksandr Kondrashov
|align=left|Congress of Russian Communities
|
|5.90%
|-
|style="background-color:"|
|align=left|Sergey Khlebnikov
|align=left|Liberal Democratic Party
|
|5.70%
|-
|style="background-color:#FF8201"|
|align=left|Sergey Sobko
|align=left|Christian-Democratic Union — Christians of Russia
|
|3.45%
|-
|style="background-color:"|
|align=left|Yelena Varfolomeyeva
|align=left|Power to the People
|
|2.55%
|-
|style="background-color:"|
|align=left|Sergey Kostylev
|align=left|Independent
|
|2.27%
|-
|style="background-color:#000000"|
|colspan=2 |against all
|
|11.47%
|-
| colspan="5" style="background-color:#E9E9E9;"|
|- style="font-weight:bold"
| colspan="3" style="text-align:left;" | Total
| 
| 100%
|-
| colspan="5" style="background-color:#E9E9E9;"|
|- style="font-weight:bold"
| colspan="4" |Source:
|
|}

1999

|-
! colspan=2 style="background-color:#E9E9E9;text-align:left;vertical-align:top;" |Candidate
! style="background-color:#E9E9E9;text-align:left;vertical-align:top;" |Party
! style="background-color:#E9E9E9;text-align:right;" |Votes
! style="background-color:#E9E9E9;text-align:right;" |%
|-
|style="background-color:#020266"|
|align=left|Vladimir Bryntsalov (incumbent)
|align=left|Russian Socialist Party
|
|26.77%
|-
|style="background-color:"|
|align=left|Sergey Sobko
|align=left|Independent
|
|16.72%
|-
|style="background-color:"|
|align=left|Anatoly Savinov
|align=left|Independent
|
|15.67%
|-
|style="background-color:"|
|align=left|Boris Lutset
|align=left|Yabloko
|
|7.32%
|-
|style="background-color:"|
|align=left|Leonid Yasenkov
|align=left|Russian All-People's Union
|
|6.55%
|-
|style="background-color:"|
|align=left|Anatoly Yepifanov
|align=left|Independent
|
|3.38%
|-
|style="background-color:"|
|align=left|Sergey Sokolov
|align=left|Independent
|
|3.03%
|-
|style="background-color:#000000"|
|colspan=2 |against all
|
|17.36%
|-
| colspan="5" style="background-color:#E9E9E9;"|
|- style="font-weight:bold"
| colspan="3" style="text-align:left;" | Total
| 
| 100%
|-
| colspan="5" style="background-color:#E9E9E9;"|
|- style="font-weight:bold"
| colspan="4" |Source:
|
|}

2003

|-
! colspan=2 style="background-color:#E9E9E9;text-align:left;vertical-align:top;" |Candidate
! style="background-color:#E9E9E9;text-align:left;vertical-align:top;" |Party
! style="background-color:#E9E9E9;text-align:right;" |Votes
! style="background-color:#E9E9E9;text-align:right;" |%
|-
|style="background-color:"|
|align=left|Sergey Sobko
|align=left|Communist Party
|
|27.16%
|-
|style="background-color:"|
|align=left|Vladimir Bryntsalov (incumbent)
|align=left|United Russia
|
|26.95%
|-
|style="background-color:#164C8C"|
|align=left|Tatyana Bodrova
|align=left|United Russian Party Rus'
|
|8.46%
|-
|style="background-color:"|
|align=left|Tatyana Ivanova
|align=left|Independent
|
|6.26%
|-
|style="background-color:"|
|align=left|Aleksandr Borisov
|align=left|Independent
|
|3.31%
|-
|style="background:#1042A5"| 
|align=left|Igor Pelevin
|align=left|Union of Right Forces
|
|2.52%
|-
|style="background-color:#00A1FF"|
|align=left|Sergey Osmakov
|align=left|Party of Russia's Rebirth-Russian Party of Life
|
|1.80%
|-
|style="background-color:"|
|align=left|Sergey Kletenkov
|align=left|Independent
|
|0.31%
|-
|style="background-color:#000000"|
|colspan=2 |against all
|
|19.85%
|-
| colspan="5" style="background-color:#E9E9E9;"|
|- style="font-weight:bold"
| colspan="3" style="text-align:left;" | Total
| 
| 100%
|-
| colspan="5" style="background-color:#E9E9E9;"|
|- style="font-weight:bold"
| colspan="4" |Source:
|
|}

2016

|-
! colspan=2 style="background-color:#E9E9E9;text-align:left;vertical-align:top;" |Candidate
! style="background-color:#E9E9E9;text-align:left;vertical-align:top;" |Party
! style="background-color:#E9E9E9;text-align:right;" |Votes
! style="background-color:#E9E9E9;text-align:right;" |%
|-
|style="background-color: " |
|align=left|Valentina Kabanova
|align=left|United Russia
|
|39.52%
|-
|style="background-color:"|
|align=left|Nina Veselova
|align=left|Communist Party
|
|14.07%
|-
|style="background-color:"|
|align=left|Sergey Sobko
|align=left|A Just Russia
|
|11.25%
|-
|style="background-color:"|
|align=left|Andrey Svintsov
|align=left|Liberal Democratic Party
|
|10.60%
|-
|style="background:"| 
|align=left|Ivan Zadumkin
|align=left|Communists of Russia
|
|4.03%
|-
|style="background-color:"|
|align=left|Artyom Kovalev
|align=left|The Greens
|
|3.77%
|-
|style="background-color:"|
|align=left|Artyom Zuyev
|align=left|Yabloko
|
|3.73%
|-
|style="background-color:"|
|align=left|Aleksandr Novopashin
|align=left|Rodina
|
|3.04%
|-
|style="background:"| 
|align=left|Yury Savelov
|align=left|Party of Growth
|
|2.98%
|-
| colspan="5" style="background-color:#E9E9E9;"|
|- style="font-weight:bold"
| colspan="3" style="text-align:left;" | Total
| 
| 100%
|-
| colspan="5" style="background-color:#E9E9E9;"|
|- style="font-weight:bold"
| colspan="4" |Source:
|
|}

2021

|-
! colspan=2 style="background-color:#E9E9E9;text-align:left;vertical-align:top;" |Candidate
! style="background-color:#E9E9E9;text-align:left;vertical-align:top;" |Party
! style="background-color:#E9E9E9;text-align:right;" |Votes
! style="background-color:#E9E9E9;text-align:right;" |%
|-
|style="background-color:"|
|align=left|Gennady Panin
|align=left|United Russia
|
|56.16%
|-
|style="background-color:"|
|align=left|Dmitry Agranovsky
|align=left|Communist Party
|
|19.05%
|-
|style="background-color:"|
|align=left|Mikhail Demidovich
|align=left|Liberal Democratic Party
|
|5.09%
|-
|style="background-color:"|
|align=left|Olga Panina
|align=left|A Just Russia — For Truth
|
|4.17%
|-
|style="background-color: "|
|align=left|Oleg Gabdrakhmanov
|align=left|Party of Pensioners
|
|3.61%
|-
|style="background-color:"|
|align=left|Yekaterina Mikhaleva
|align=left|The Greens
|
|2.47%
|-
|style="background-color:"|
|align=left|Sergey Belokhvost
|align=left|Rodina
|
|2.11%
|-
|style="background: "| 
|align=left|Anton Galkin
|align=left|Yabloko
|
|2.10%
|-
|style="background:"| 
|align=left|Pavel Shelpakov
|align=left|Party of Growth
|
|1.15%
|-
| colspan="5" style="background-color:#E9E9E9;"|
|- style="font-weight:bold"
| colspan="3" style="text-align:left;" | Total
| 
| 100%
|-
| colspan="5" style="background-color:#E9E9E9;"|
|- style="font-weight:bold"
| colspan="4" |Source:
|
|}

Notes

References

Russian legislative constituencies
Politics of Moscow Oblast